Marco Koskas is a French-Israeli writer.

Biography
His novel Balace Bounel won the Prix du Premier Roman award for young novelists in 1979.

In 1980, he joins the Editions Grasset, thanks to Bernard-Henri Lévy, to publish Destino.

In 2018, his novel Bande de Français, which was self-published on CreateSpace, was nominated for the Prix Renaudot.

Books

Novels
Balace Bounel, Ramsay, 1979 ; rééd. Pocket, 1989 (prix du premier roman)
Destino, Grasset, 1981
L’Homme de paille, Calmann Levy, 1988
L’Étrangère (récit), Calmann Levy, 1988
La Position Tango, J.-C. Lattès, 1990
Albert Schweitzer ou le Démon du bien (biographie), J.-C. Lattès, 1992 ; rééd. Livre de Poche, 1992
Arafat ou le palestinien imaginaire (biographie), J.-C. Lattès, 1994
J’ai pas fermé l’œil de l'été, Julliard, 1995
L’Hindou assis sur son trésor (récit), JC Lattès, 1997
Love and stress, Laffont, 2002
Avoue d'abord, La Table Ronde, 2007
Aline, pour qu’elle revienne (roman), éditions Baleine, 2009
Mon cœur de père (journal), Fayard, 2012
Ivresse du reproche (roman), Fayard, 2013

Autoedited novels
Bande de Français, Galligrasud, Amazon, 2018
Toutes les femmes ou presque, Galligrasud, Amazon, 2019

Theatre 
 Le Roi des Schnorrers, Lansmann, 2002
 Dov de Deauville, inédit (sous-titres en hébreu d'Emmanuel Pinto)

References

Year of birth missing (living people)
Living people
French writers